Susto (which the band usually capitalizes as SUSTO) is an American indie rock band from Charleston, South Carolina.

The name of the band is from the Spanish word "susto", meaning "an intense fear understood as a condition of the soul", reflecting the Cuban roots of some of the band, as well as being drawn from letters in the band leader's name.

History
Susto began in 2014 with the release of a self-titled album on the record label Hearts & Plugs. Susto released their second full-length album titled & I'm Fine Today on ACID BOYS and Missing Piece Records. Their third album, 'Ever Since I Lost My Mind', was released on February 22, 2019, on Rounder Records.

In April 2018 Susto performed at the High Water Festival in North Charleston, South Carolina.

In March 2019 Susto performed at Antone's Georgia Theatre in Austin, TX for the South by Southwest festival in Austin, Texas.

Discography

Studio albums 
 SUSTO (2014) (Hearts & Plugs)
 & I'm Fine Today (2017)  (Missing Piece Records, ACID BOYS)
 Ever Since I Lost My Mind (2019) (Rounder Records)
 Time in the Sun (2021) (New West Records)

Live albums 
 Live from the Australian Country Music Hall of Fame (2015)  (Missing Piece Records)

EPs 
 Hearts & Plugs 7s, Vol 1 (2015)  (Hearts and Plugs)
SUSTO Stories (2018) (Missing Piece Records, ACID BOYS)

Singles 
 Chillin' On The Beach With My Best Friend Jesus Christ (2016)  (Hearts and Plugs)
R.I.P. Santa (2017)  (Missing Piece Records, ACID BOYS)

References

2013 establishments in South Carolina
Musical groups from South Carolina